Khristo Kovachki (born 23 March 1967) is a Bulgarian biathlete. He competed in the 20 km individual event at the 1988 Winter Olympics.

References

External links
 

1967 births
Living people
Bulgarian male biathletes
Olympic biathletes of Bulgaria
Biathletes at the 1988 Winter Olympics
Place of birth missing (living people)